Darreh Darreh may refer to:
 Darreh Darreh-ye Olya
 Darreh Darreh Rezaabad